Adyroma is a genus of moths of the family Noctuidae.

Species
Adyroma reposita Moschler, 1880

References
Natural History Museum Lepidoptera genus database

Calpinae
Noctuoidea genera